The Pilar Bayona Piano Competition was a piano competition held in Zaragoza in memory of pianist Pilar Bayona (1897-1979). It was dissolved in 2004 and converted into a series of grants for Aragonese musicians. It was a member of the World Federation of International Music Competitions.

1st prize winners
 1983  Johan Schmidt
 1985  Martin Söderberg
 1987  Igor Kamenz
 1989  Oleg Marshev
 1992  Claudio Martínez Mehner
 1995  Valeria Resian
 1998  Dror Biran
 2001  Domenico Codispoti

Other notable winners
   Petras Geniusas 1989, 2nd prize.
  Kirill Gerstein 1998, 2nd prize.
  Alexandre Moutouzkine 2001, 3rd prize.
  Jean-Pierre Ferey 1983, special prize.

External links
Pilar Bayona Official Webpage (Archived)
Easiest Songs to Learn on the Piano for Kids & Beginners

Piano competitions
History of Zaragoza
Music competitions in Spain